Delphinium is a genus of about 300 species of annual and perennial flowering plants in the family Ranunculaceae, native throughout the Northern Hemisphere and also on the high mountains of tropical Africa. The genus was erected by Carl Linnaeus.

All members of the genus Delphinium are toxic to humans and livestock. The common name larkspur is shared between perennial Delphinium species and annual species of the genus Consolida. Molecular data show that Consolida, as well as another segregate genus, Aconitella, are both embedded in Delphinium.

The genus name Delphinium derives from the Ancient Greek word  which means "dolphin", a name used in De Materia Medica for some kind of larkspur. Pedanius Dioscorides said the plant got its name because of its dolphin-shaped flowers.

Habitat
Species with short stems and few flowers such as Delphinium nuttallianum and Delphinium bicolor appear in habitats like prairies and the sagebrush steppe. Tall and robust species with many flowers, such as Delphinium occidentale, appear more often in forests.

Description

The leaves are deeply lobed with three to seven toothed, pointed lobes in a palmate shape. The main flowering stem is erect, and varies greatly in size between the species, from 10 centimetres in some alpine species, up to 2 m tall in the larger meadowland species.

In June and July (Northern Hemisphere), the plant is topped with a raceme of many flowers, varying in colour from purple and blue, to red, yellow, or white. The flowers are bilaterally symmetrical and have many stamens. In most species each flower consists of five petal-like sepals which grow together to form a hollow pocket with a spur at the end, which gives the plant its name, usually more or less dark blue. Within the sepals are four true petals, small, inconspicuous, and commonly coloured similarly to the sepals. The uppermost sepal is spurred, and encloses the nectar-secreting spurs of the two upper petals.

The seeds are small and often shiny black. The plants flower from late spring to late summer, and are pollinated by butterflies and bumble bees. Despite the toxicity, Delphinium species are used as food plants by the larvae of some Lepidoptera species, including the dot moth and small angle shades.

Taxonomy

Delineation of Delphinium 

Genetic analysis suggests that Delphinium sensu lato, as it was delineated before the 21st century, is polyphyletic. Nested within Delphinium s.l. are Aconitella, Consolida, and Aconitum. To make Delphinium monophyletic, several interventions were made. The new genus Staphisagria was erected containing Staphisagria macrosperma (D. staphisagria), S. requienii (D. requini) and S. picta (D. pictum), representing the sister group to all other Delphinieae. Further genetic analysis has shown that the two large subgenera Aconitum (Aconitum) and Aconitum (Lycoctonum) are the sister group to Aconitum gymnandrum, Delphinium (Delphinium), Delphinium (Delphinastrum), Consolida and Aconitella. To make Aconitum monophyletic, A. gymnandrum has now been reassigned to a new monotypic genus, Gymnaconitum. Finally, Consolida and Aconitella are synonymized with Delphinium.

Subgenera 
D. arthriscifolium is sister to all other species of Delphinium sensu stricto (so excluding Staphisagria). It should be placed in its own subgenus, but no proposal naming this subgenus has been made yet. The subgenera Delphinium (Delphinium) and Delphinium (Delphinastrum) are sister to the group consisting of the species of Consolida and Aconitella, which together make up the subgenus Delphinium (Consolida). Aconitella cannot be retained as a subgenus because A. barbata does not cluster with the remaining species previously assigned to that genus, without creating five further subgenera.

Selected species

Species include:

 Delphinium andersonii
 Delphinium arthriscifolium
 Delphinium bakeri
 Delphinium barbeyi
 Delphinium bicolour
 Delphinium brunonianum
 Delphinium californicum
 Delphinium calthifolium
 Delphinium cardinale
 Delphinium carolinianum
 Delphinium cheilanthum
 Delphinium consolida
 Delphinium decorum
 Delphinium denudatum
 Delphinium depauperatum
 Delphinium elatum
 Delphinium exaltatum
 Delphinium formosum
 Delphinium glaucum
 Delphinium gracilentum
 Delphinium grandiflorum
 Delphinium gypsophilum
 Delphinium hansenii
 Delphinium hesperium
 Delphinium hutchinsoniae
 Delphinium hybridum
 Delphinium inopinum
 Delphinium ithaburense
 Delphinium leucophaeum
 Delphinium luteum
 Delphinium malabaricum
 Delphinium nudicaule
 Delphinium nuttallianum
 Delphinium occidentale
 Delphinium parishii
 Delphinium parryi
 Delphinium patens
 Delphinium pavonaceum
 Delphinium peregrinum
 Delphinium polycladon
 Delphinium purpusii
 Delphinium recurvatum
 Delphinium robustum
 Delphinium scopulorum
 Delphinium stachydeum
 Delphinium tricorne
 Delphinium trolliifolium
 Delphinium uliginosum
 Delphinium umbraculorum
 Delphinium variegatum
 Delphinium viridescens

Reassigned species 
Several species of Delphinium have been reassigned:

 D. pictum = Staphisagria picta
 D. requienii = Staphisagria requienii
 D. staphisagria = Staphisagria macrosperma

Ecology
Delphiniums can attract butterflies and other pollinators.

Cultivation

Various delphiniums  are cultivated as ornamental plants, for traditional and native plant gardens. The numerous hybrids and cultivars are primarily used as garden plants, providing height at the back of the summer border, in association with roses, lilies, and geraniums.

Most delphinium hybrids and cultivars are derived from D. elatum. Hybridisation was developed in the 19th century, led by Victor Lemoine in France. Other hybrid crosses have included D. bruninianum, D. cardinale, D. cheilanthum, and D. formosum.

Numerous cultivars have been selected as garden plants, and for cut flowers and floristry. They are available in shades of white, pink, purple, and blue. The blooming plant is also used in displays and specialist competitions at flower and garden shows, such as the Chelsea Flower Show.

The 'Pacific Giant' hybrids are a group with individual single-colour cultivar names, developed by Reinelt in the United States. They reportedly can tolerate deer. Millennium delphinium hybrids, bred by Dowdeswell's in New Zealand, are reportedly better in warmer climates than the Pacific hybrids. Flower colours in shades of red, orange, and pink have been hybridized from D. cardinale by Americans Reinelt and Samuelson.

Award of garden merit
The following delphinium cultivars have received the Award of Garden Merit from the British Royal Horticultural Society:

Toxicity
All parts of these plants are considered toxic to humans, especially the younger parts, causing severe digestive discomfort if ingested, and skin irritation. Larkspur, especially tall larkspur, is a significant cause of cattle poisoning on rangelands in the western United States. Larkspur is more common in high-elevation areas, and many ranchers delay moving cattle onto such ranges until late summer when the toxicity of the plants is reduced.
Death is through cardiotoxic and neuromuscular blocking effects, and can occur within a few hours of ingestion. All parts of the plant contain various diterpenoid alkaloids, typified by methyllycaconitine, and are very poisonous.

Uses
The juice of the flowers, particularly D. consolida, mixed with alum, gives a blue ink.

All plant parts are poisonous in large doses, especially the seeds, that contain up to 1.4% of alkaloids.

References

External links

 [https://web.archive.org/web/19990501235849/http://www.ars-grin.gov/cgi-bin/npgs/html/genform.pl GRIN: Species in the genus Delphinium'] — with links by species for information + synonyms.
 USDA-ARS: Larkspur—Delphinium spp. Fact Sheet — native U.S. species and grazing toxicity.
 MBG—Kemper Center for Home Gardening: Delphinium "Pacific Giant Hybrids" — horticultural information.
 Dowdeswell's Ltd: "Growing New Millennium Delphiniums in the U.S. & Canada" — horticultural information''.

 
Delphinieae
Garden plants
Medicinal plants
Ranunculaceae genera
Poisonous plants